Villalón or Villalon may refer to:

Alberto Villalón (1882–1955), one of the greatest musicians in the Cuban trova style
Consuelo Villalon Aleman (1907–1998), a well-known Mexican pianist during the 20th century
Eric Villalon (born 1973), a Paralympic alpine skier from Spain
Fernando Villalón (1881–1930), a Spanish poet and farmer
Jade Villalon (born 1980), an American and European pop singer, songwriter, and actress
María Villalón (born 1989), a Spanish singer, winner of the first series of Spanish version of The X Factor in 2007
Pedro de Rivera y Villalón, a brigadier general in the Spanish army, which was sent to New Mexico in 1724

See also
Villalón de Campos, a municipality located in the province of Valladolid, Castile and León, Spain

es:Villalón